Federal Courts Building may refer to:
United States Courthouse and Post Office (Kansas City, Missouri), historic courthouse and post office, also known as Federal Courts Building, in Kansas City, Missouri
Landmark Center (St. Paul), historic United States Post Office, Courthouse, and Custom House for the state of Minnesota, also known as Old Federal Courts Building, in Saint Paul, Minnesota